Dailuaine distillery ("Green Meadow") is a single malt whisky distillery in Charlestown-of-Aberlour, Strathspey, Scotland.

History 
The Distillery was founded in 1852 by William Mackenzie. When he died in 1865 his widow leased the distillery to James Fleming, a banker from Aberlour. Together with William Mackenzie's son he founded Mackenzie and Company.

1863 Branch line opened to the distillery from Carron station on the Strathspey Railway, 1.25 miles long.
1884 Dailuaine is renovated and enlarged.
1891 Dailuaine-Glenlivet Distillery Ltd. was founded. In 1898, Dailuaine-Glenlivet and Talisker Distillery Ltd. are fused to Dailuaine-Talisker Distilleries Ltd.
1899 Charles C. Doig designs a new distillery with a pagoda like roof that becomes the standard design for Scottish distilleries.
1915 Thomas Mackenzie died and the company was sold to John Dewar & Sons, John Walker & Sons and James Buchanan & Co. one year later.
1917 a  fire destroyed the pagoda-roof. The distillery had to close, reopened three years later and was bought by Distillers Company Limited (DCL) in 1925.
1960 the Distillery is completely renovated and is enlarged from four to six stills. Since 1983 the malt is no longer produced inhouse.
1939 New 0-4-0ST loco purchased from the Caledonia Works of Andrew Barclay Sons & Co.  Ltd., Kilmarnock (AB2073/1939) to work the branch to the mainline at Carron. Loco named after the distillery, DAILUAINE.
1987 Dailuaine was taken over by United Distillers (UD).

See also
 Speyside Single Malts
 Whisky
 Scotch whisky
 List of whisky brands
 List of distilleries in Scotland

References

External links
Dailuaine Distillery

Scottish malt whisky
Distilleries in Scotland
1852 establishments in Scotland